Glen Milton Leonard (born 1938) is an American historian specializing in Mormon history.

Background 
Leonard is a native of Farmington, Utah.  He received his Ph.D. in history from the University of Utah.  For a time he was managing editor of Utah Historical Quarterly.  He has taught at both Brigham Young University and Utah State University.  Leonard has been the director of the Museum of Church History and Art in Salt Lake City since it opened in 1984.

Leonard and his wife Karen had three sons. They live in Farmington, Utah.

Among other callings in the LDS Church, Leonard has served as seventies quorum president, bishop and counselor in a stake presidency. He later served as president of the Farmington Utah North Stake.

Published work
Leonard has authored and co-authored several books on Mormon history. Among these are Nauvoo: A Place of Peace, A People of Promise and A History of Davis County, Utah.  He also co-authored The Story of the Latter-day Saints with James B. Allen and Massacre at Mountain Meadows with Richard E. Turley, Jr. and Ronald W. Walker.

See also 
 Latter Day Saint historians

Notes

References 
 Deseret Book authors bio.
 Church News, September 23, 1995.

External links 
 
 

1938 births
American Latter Day Saint writers
American leaders of the Church of Jesus Christ of Latter-day Saints
Brigham Young University faculty
Directors of museums in the United States
Historians of the Latter Day Saint movement
Latter Day Saints from Utah
Living people
People from Farmington, Utah
Seventies (LDS Church)
University of Utah alumni
Utah State University faculty